The 1992 FIVB Volleyball World League was the third edition of the annual men's international volleyball tournament, played by 12 countries from 1 May to 5 September 1992. The Final Round was held in Genoa, Italy.

Pools composition

Intercontinental round

Pool A

|}

|}

Pool B

|}

|}

Pool C

|}

|}

Playoff round
 The top four teams qualified for the final phase.
 The results of all the matches in the first round were taken into account for this round.

|}

|}

Final round
Venue:  Palasport di Genova, Genoa, Italy
All times are Central European Summer Time (UTC+02:00).

Semifinals

|}

3rd place match

|}

Final

|}

Final standing

Awards
Most Valuable Player
  Lorenzo Bernardi

Best Spiker
  Marcelo Negrão

Best Setter
  Raúl Diago

Best Blocker
  Ruslan Olihver

Best Server
  Andrea Zorzi

Best Receiver
  Xiang Chang

Best Digger
  Jan Posthuma

External links

1992 World League Results
1992 World League results 
Sports123

FIVB Volleyball World League
FIVB World League
Volleyball
1992 in Italian sport